Sergiu Sîrbu (born 1 April 1986) is a Moldovan football player, who plays as midfielder or defender.

Sîrbu has debuted for Moldova U-21 national football team on 24 August 2007, in a match against Ukraine. He played in Moldovan National Division for 5 teams.

Career 
2004-2005 FC Unisport-Auto Chișinău (National Division - 8 matches)
2005-2006 FC Otaci (Divizia A)
2006-2007 FC Dacia-2 Goliador (Divizia A)
2007-2008 FC Besiktas Chișinău (Divizia A, Moldovan Cup)
2007-2008 FC Olimpia-2 (Divizia A)
2008-2009 FC Olimpia Bălți
2009-2010 FC Zimbru Chișinău
2009-2010 FC Milsami Orhei
2010-2011 FC Zimbru Chișinău
2010-2011 FC Costuleni
2011-2012 FC Costuleni
2012-2013 FC Zimbru Chișinău
2013-2015 FC Costuleni

References

External links
 
 
 

1986 births
Living people
Moldovan footballers
FC Zimbru Chișinău players
Association football defenders
Association football midfielders
People from Telenești District